Blinded (2006) is a Grenadian feature film about domestic violence directed by Anderson Quarless and starring Deleon Walters and Tahira Carter. It was the first full-length film entirely produced in Grenada.

Plot
Clara  meets John at a particularly vulnerable time in her life. She is "blinded" by love and he becomes her world. The intense relationship then becomes violent and Clara is forced to take drastic action to protect herself and their son Chris.

Cast and crew information
This film has an entire local cast and crew, and was filmed in a various locations throughout Grenada, Carriacou and Petite Martinique including beaches, waterfalls and other scenic locations.

Deleon Walters as John
Tahira Natalie Carter as Clara
Bassanio Nicholas
Lindon "Fatman" George
Claudia Morgan-Carter

Distribution
The movie premiered to Grenadian audiences on January 28, 2006, at the Grenada Trade Center and February 4, 2006, at St. George's University.

Reception
The movie received international recognition when it was selected for the 2007 New York International Independent Film and Video Festival.

See also
List of Caribbean films

References

External links 
 

2006 films
Films about domestic violence
Films set in Grenada
Grenadian culture